Marks is a city in and the county seat of Quitman County, Mississippi. As of the 2010 census, the city population was 1,735.

History
The town of Marks was named after Leopold Marks (1851-1910) who left Germany to avoid conscription by the German army. He arrived in New York in 1868.  Marks, a Jew, became Quitman County's first representative to the state legislature and served for eight years.  He encouraged the Yazoo and Mississippi Valley Railroad to come to the area by giving the railroad company, without cost, the right-of-way through his plantation plus  of land. Leopold Marks' son Henry donated land to the town to be used as a cemetery.

The official "founding" of the town is considered to be May 12, 1907; on May 12, 2007, the town celebrated its centennial.

On September 26, 1913 a black man named Walter Brownloe, accused of attacking a white farmer's wife, was taken from the town prison by a mob and hanged.

Marks was the starting point of Dr. Martin Luther King Jr's Poor People's Campaign in 1968.

Amtrak's City of New Orleans began stopping at Marks on April 4, 2018. A new station was built for passengers to get on or get off.

Geography

Climate

Demographics

2020 census

As of the 2020 United States census, there were 1,444 people, 699 households, and 425 families residing in the city.

2000 census
As of the census of 2000, there were 1,551 people, 579 households, and 387 families residing in the city. The population density was 1,509.9 people per square mile (581.4/km2). There were 643 housing units at an average density of 625.9 per square mile (241.0/km2). The racial makeup of the city was 34.62% White, 64.67% African American, 0.06% Native American, 0.19% Asian, and 0.45% from two or more races. Hispanic or Latino of any race were 0.39% of the population.

There were 579 households, out of which 33.0% had children under the age of 18 living with them, 32.0% were married couples living together, 29.2% had a female householder with no husband present, and 33.0% were non-families. 29.7% of all households were made up of individuals, and 13.0% had someone living alone who was 65 years of age or older. The average household size was 2.55 and the average family size was 3.16.

In the city, the population was spread out, with 28.7% under the age of 18, 8.4% from 18 to 24, 26.8% from 25 to 44, 16.7% from 45 to 64, and 19.3% who were 65 years of age or older. The median age was 35 years. For every 100 females, there were 81.6 males. For every 100 females age 18 and over, there were 73.1 males.

The median income for a household in the city was $20,521, and the median income for a family was $27,153. Males had a median income of $25,100 versus $16,985 for females. The per capita income for the city was $11,104. About 26.1% of families and 30.3% of the population were below the poverty line, including 39.9% of those under age 18 and 27.7% of those age 65 or over.

Education
The City of Marks is served by the Quitman County School District.

Delta Academy, a private school, is in Marks.

Notable people
Larry Garron, Professional football player
Frederick W. Smith, Founder and CEO of FedEx Corporation
Carolyn Stanford Taylor, Wisconsin Superintendent of Public Instruction

Gallery

References

External links
 Re-enactment of anti-poverty march to begin in Marks -- Clarksdale Press Register, Aug 1 '03

Cities in Mississippi
Cities in Quitman County, Mississippi
County seats in Mississippi
Populated places established in 1907
1907 establishments in Mississippi